The Iglesia Parroquial de San Antonio de Padua is a historic, Roman Catholic parish church in Guayama, Puerto Rico. The parish was erected in 1736 and the first church building completed no later than 1775. The original appearance of the building is unknown, but some of the eighteenth century walls may survive in the present structure. The building was rebuilt twice in the nineteenth century and the present appearance dates from 1874. It takes an overall Romanesque form, while the details exhibit the eclecticism that characterized much Puerto Rican architecture in the later 1800s.

The church was inscribed on the National Register of Historic Places in 1976.

Gallery

See also
 National Register of Historic Places listings in southern Puerto Rico

References

External links
 
 

Churches on the National Register of Historic Places in Puerto Rico
Roman Catholic churches in Puerto Rico
19th-century Roman Catholic church buildings
1736 establishments in Puerto Rico
Romanesque Revival church buildings
National Register of Historic Places in Guayama, Puerto Rico
Romanesque Revival architecture